North Western Administration is an administration in the central Maekel region (Zoba Maekel) of Eritrea.

References

Administrations of Asmara

Anseba Region
Subregions of Eritrea